Arthur's Magazine (1844–1846) was an American literary periodical published in Philadelphia in the 19th century. Edited by Timothy Shay Arthur, it featured work by Edgar A. Poe, J.H. Ingraham, Sarah Josepha Hale, Thomas G. Spear, and others. In May 1846 it was merged into Godey's Lady's Book.

A few years later Arthur would launch a new publication entitled Arthur's Home Magazine.

References

Further reading
 Arthur's Magazine. (1845).

External links

 Hathi Trust. Arthur's Magazine, 1844-1846

19th century in the United States
Defunct literary magazines published in the United States
Monthly magazines published in the United States
Defunct women's magazines published in the United States
History of women in Pennsylvania
Magazines established in 1844
Magazines disestablished in 1846
Magazines published in Philadelphia